Verconia alboannulata is a species of colourful sea slug, a dorid nudibranch, a shell-less marine gastropod mollusk in the family Chromodorididae.

Distribution
This species occurs in the Red Sea and off Australia (Queensland).

References

External links
 

Chromodorididae
Gastropods described in 1986